Maurice Yvain (12 February 1891 – 27 July 1965) was a French composer noted for his operettas of the 1920s and 1930s. Some of which were written for Mistinguett, at one time the best-paid female entertainer in the world. In the 1930s and 1940s, he became a major success in the United States and several of his pieces appeared in the famous Ziegfeld Follies on Broadway. He also composed music for several films of notable directors such as Anatole Litvak, Julien Duvivier, and Henri-Georges Clouzot. Yvain's music blended with the then "spirit of Paris".

Biography

Maurice Yvain was born in 1891 into a musical family in Paris. He was educated by his father, who played the trumpet in the Orchestre de l'Opéra-Comique. From 1903, he studied at the Conservatoire de Paris where he was a pupil of Louis Diemer and Xavier Leroux. An excellent pianist, he first played as an accompanying pianist at the Casino d'Évian.  He went on to play with the orchestra at the Casino de Monte Carlo and in the Parisien Cabaret des Quat'z'Arts.

After military service from 1912 to 1919, he returned to Paris where he started to compose songs for light music, operettas, musicals, for films such as Vincent Scotto and Henri Christiné. One of his early successes was "Dansez-vous le foxtrot" in 1919. Maurice Chevalier, whom he had met in the army, introduced him to Albert Willemetz and to the popular Mistinguett who sang one of his best-known songs "Mon Homme" ("My Man") (1920). In 1968, it was sung by Barbra Streisand in the film Funny Girl. He composed several other pieces for Mistinguett, including "En douce" (1920), "La Java" (1922), "J'en ai marre" (1922) and "La Belote" (1925). In the 1920s, he began to compose operettas, 18 in all; his satirical “Ta Bouche”  (Your Mouth, 1922) of 1922 was a particular success. The sequels which followed were the "Pas sur la Bouche" (Not on the Mouth, 1925) and the "Bouche a Bouche" (Mouth to Mouth, 1925) and both further established the musical virtuosity of Yvain; the former song  rendered by Regine Flory made her also a celebrity. Thereafter, he also wrote great sentimental operettas such as "Chanson gitane" ("Gypsy Song"), many of which were performed at the Théâtre des Bouffes Parisiens. His pieces are characterized by rhythmic precision, imagination and flexibility of musical phrases. A. Willemetz, Jacques-Charles, H. Varna and H. Heanson were his lyricists and librettists. Occasionally he also wrote the lyrics.

In the 1930s, his operettas were almost immediately translated and performed in Germany, Hungary and Austria as well as on Broadway where Ta Bouche was presented over a hundred times. Thanks to his success in the United States, several of his pieces appeared in the famous Ziegfeld Follies on Broadway. His "Mon Homme" featured in the 1936 MGM Academy Award-winning film The Great Ziegfeld. He composed music for several films of notable directors such as Anatole Litvak, Julien Duvivier and Henri-Georges Clouzot. Yvain died in 1965 in Suresnes, near Paris.

Works
Maurice Yvain's "Catalog of Works" consisted of 25 soundtracks, 21 titles as composer, one title of Indochine (composer of the song "La môme Caoutchouc" 1992). Some of these works are: 

1919 – "Pour être heureux", sung by Polaire
1920 – "En douce", song created for Mistinguett
1920 – "Rien qu'un baiser" sung by Félix Mayol et Dalbret
1920 – "Mon homme", song created for Mistinguett
1920 – "Si tu ne veux pas payer d'impôts", song created for Dréan
1920 – "J'n'ose pas", song created for Maurice Chevalier
1920 – "Cach' ton piano", song created for Dréan
1920 – "Tout en dansant le fox-trot", song created for Maurice Chevalier
1920 – "L'un dans l'autre", song created for Maurice Chevalier
1921 – Ta Bouche, libretto by Yves Mirande and A. Silent
1921 – "Avec le sourire", song created for Maurice Chevalier
1923 – Là-Haut, opéra bouffe, libretto by Yves Mirande and Albert Willemetz with Maurice Chevalier and Dranem
1922 – "La Java", song created for Mistinguett
1922 – "J'en ai marre", song created for Mistinguett
1924 – Gosse de Riche (Rich Kid), musical comedy, libretto by J. Bousquet and H. Falk
1924 – La Dame en décolleté (The Lady in cleavage), libretto by Yves Mirande and Lucien Boyer
1925 - Pas sur la bouche (Not on the lips), libretto by André Barde and Maurice Yvain
1925 – "La Belote", song created for Mistinguett
1925 – Un bon garcon, combining music and theatre, music and lyrics by Yvain
1927 – "Dites-moi ma mère", song created for Maurice Chevalier
1928 – Les Ailes (Wings), musical revue, libretto by Albert Willemetz, A. Mouézy-Eon and Saint-Granier
1928 – Yes, libretto by P. Soulaine, R. Pujol and Albert Willemetz
1928 – "Je t'emmène à la campagne", song created for Georges Milton
1928 – "Charmantes choses", sung by Florelle
1929 – Elle est à vous, libretto by André Barde
1929 – "Pouêt-Pouêt", song created for Georges Milton
1931 – Paris qui brille, libretto by H. Varna with Mistinguett
1932 – "J'ai pas su y faire", sung by Yvonne George
1932 – "La môme caoutchouc", sung by Jean Gabin then in 1935 by Fréhel
1933 – Oh! Papa, libretto by André Barde
1934 – La Belle histoire, libretto by Henri-Georges Clouzot based on Perrault's Le Chat Botté (Puss in Boots)
1935 – Au Soleil du Mexique, operetta, libretto bye Albert Willemetz and A. Mouézy-Eon
1935 – "C'est toujours ça de pris", song created for Marie Dubas
1935 – Aux portes de Paris, film music
1935 – Sans famille, film music 
1935 – Vacances, operetta, libretto by H. Duvernois and André Barde
1936 – Les deux gamines, film musique
1937 – Vents (Winds), ballet for the Universal Exposition
1947 – Chanson gitane (Gypsy song), libretto by Louis Poterat
1949 – "Le chant des étoiles"
1950 - Snowhite
1953 – Toutes les femmes (All Women), libretto by Albert Willemetz
1958 – Le Corsaire Noir (The Black Corsair), libretto by J. Valmy, created in Marseilles

He has also rendered 100 dance and dance songs.

Books
1962. My beautiful operetta [memories]. Paris: The Round Table.

References

Bibliography

External links 
 Maurice Yvain on data.bnf.fr
 

French operetta composers
1891 births
1965 deaths
Musicians from Paris
20th-century French composers